Montpelier or Montpellier may refer to:

Locations

Australia

 Montpelier (Queensland), a hill in the suburb of Bowen Hills, Brisbane

Canada
 Montpellier, Quebec

France
 Montpellier, a city in southern France
 The University of Montpellier

Ireland
 Montpelier, County Limerick, a village in northeast County Limerick, across the River Shannon from O'Briensbridge
 Montpelier Hill, a hill in the Dublin Mountains, County Dublin, location of the Irish Hellfire Club

United Kingdom
 Montpelier, Brighton, an early 19th-century suburb of Brighton, England
 Montpelier Crescent, a 38-house crescent of listed residential buildings in the suburb
 Montpelier, Bristol, an inner city neighbourhood in Bristol, England
 Montpellier, Cheltenham, a district in Gloucestershire, England
 the Montpellier Quarter in Harrogate, England
 Montpelier, London, a suburb of west London, close to Ealing Broadway.

United States
Montpelier, California
Montpelier, Idaho
Montpelier, Indiana
Montpelier, Iowa
Montpelier, Kentucky
Montpelier, Louisiana
Montpelier, the general Henry Knox mansion, housing the Knox Museum, in Thomaston, Maine
Montpelier, Maryland
Montpelier (Clear Spring, Maryland), a historic mansion
Montpelier Mansion (Laurel, Maryland), a U.S. National Historic Landmark
Montpelier, Mississippi
Montpelier, North Dakota
Montpelier, Ohio
Montpelier, Vermont, capital city of the state of Vermont
Montpelier, Charles City County, Virginia
Montpelier, Hanover County, Virginia
Montpelier (Cabin Point, Virginia), listed on the National Register of Historic Places (NRHP)
Montpelier (Orange, Virginia), the Virginia estate of James Madison, fourth President of the United States
Montpelier (Sperryville, Virginia), NRHP-listed

Ships
USS Montpelier (CL-57), a Cleveland class cruiser which served in the Pacific during World War II
USS Montpelier (SSN-765), a Los Angeles class submarine currently in service

Sports clubs

In the French city
Montpellier Hérault RC, Montpellier Hérault Rugby Club, a professional rugby union
Montpellier HSC, Montpellier Hérault Sport Club, a football club
Montpellier Water-Polo, multiple winners of the French water polo championship

Other uses 
Montpelier station (disambiguation), stations of the name

See also
 Montpelier Historic District (disambiguation)